Major land reclamation in the United Arab Emirates, though a relatively recent phenomenon, has significantly changed the geography of some parts of the country. So basically Some of the largest land reclamation projects have occurred in the UAE. Multiple land reclamation projects, both completed, under construction, and planned, have changed the appearance of Dubai, Abu Dhabi, and other emirates.

History

Abu Dhabi

One reclamation method used in Abu Dhabi is filling in low-lying coastal salt flats. Several industrial areas have been built in these areas. Yas Island, Al Reem Island, and Al Lulu Island are a few examples.

Ajman

There have been proposals to reclaim land from the sea in Ajman. However, many have been rejected due to environmental concerns.

Dubai

Land reclamation in the emirate of Dubai has made it one of the most recognizable areas in the world. Dubai is perhaps most well known for land reclamation projects such as the Palm Islands, the World Islands, the Dubai Marina, and the Burj Al Arab. Most major land reclamation projects in Dubai have occurred in the past fifteen years, and the Burj Al Arab hotel, which is built on a man-made island, was started in 1994 and completed in 1999.

Ras Al Khaimah

The emirate of Ras Al Khaimah has also joined the race to build new land reclamation projects. Such projects include Al Marjan Island and its Real Madrid Resort Island.

Geography

The Palm Islands are located off the coast of the United Arab Emirates in the Persian Gulf and will add 520 kilometers of beaches to the city of Dubai.

Projects

 The World Islands
 Burj Al Arab
 Palm Jumeirah
 Palm Jebel Ali
 Palm Deira
 Al Marjan Island
 Yas Island
 Al Reem Island
 The Universe Islands
 Port Rashid

Issues
There have been numerous environmental and economic concerns regarding the various land reclamation projects in the UAE. For example, extraction of rock and sand harms local environments and wildlife such as birds.

See also
 Geography of Dubai
 Palm islands
 The World Islands
 Developments in Dubai
 Land reclamation
 Land reclamation in Hong Kong
 Land reclamation in Monaco

References

Coastal engineering
Geography of the United Arab Emirates
Land reclamation